Frank Andrea Miller (March 28, 1925 – February 17, 1983) was an American editorial cartoonist. He was a cartoonist for the Des Moines Register from 1953 to 1983.  In 1963, Miller received the Pulitzer Prize for Editorial Cartooning for his notable editorial cartoon on nuclear warfare which depicts a world destroyed and one ragged figure saying to another, "I said—we sure settled that dispute, didn't we!"

Awards
 1953 - National Headliner Award
 1963 - Pulitzer Prize for Editorial Cartooning

Publications
 Miller, Frank. Frank Miller Looks At Life, Des Moines Register, 1962.
 Miller, Frank. Cartoons as Commentary: Three Decades at the Register, Des Moines Register, 1983.
 Miller, Frank & Miller, Mindy. "Portraits of Alcoholism, "Plain Talk Publishing, Des Moines, 1988.

External links
 The Papers of Frank Miller, held by the Special Collections Department, University of Iowa Libraries

References

1925 births
1983 deaths
American editorial cartoonists
Pulitzer Prize for Editorial Cartooning winners
Artists from Des Moines, Iowa